Ordinary Man is the tenth studio album by Irish folk artist, Christy Moore. It features songs like "Ordinary Man", "St. Brendan's Voyage" and "Another Song is Born".
The album featured songs by Peter Hames, Johnny Mulhearn, Hugh McDonald, Colm Gallagher and Floyd Red Crow Westerman; as well as some backing vocals by Enya on "Quiet Desperation", "Sweet Music Roll On" and "The Diamondtina  Drover" and some fine uilleann pipes work by Liam O'Flynn. The original release of the album featured the song "They Never Came Home" which Moore wrote for the victims and families of the Stardust fire. The song was quickly removed from the album because the lyrics were found to be libelous.

Summary
Ordinary Man, as the name suggests, was an album for the working man. The songs and music reflected the economic atmosphere of Ireland and of Great Britain at the time. The title song, "Ordinary Man", was written by Grimsby musician Peter Hames and depicts a factory worker losing his job as the plant closes down, and his struggle to survive. The album also has a strong link to Moore's Irish roots with songs like "St. Brendans Voyage" and "Delirium Tremens" both relating directly to Ireland.
Dónal Lunny played a major part in the album, writing much of the music for the songs. A long time friend of Moore, Lunny was also a member of Planxty and has worked closely with him for many years. The other former bandmates from Planxty who worked on the album were Andy Irvine and Liam O'Flynn. And Moving Hearts bandmate of both Moore and Lunny, Noel Eccles, lent some percussion aid to a couple of songs.

Songs and music
The songs and music are linked with the economic climate of Ireland at the time, the general dissatisfaction at government and still retains close links with Irish Music. Arty McGlynn, is the guitar mastermind on most of the songs on the album but the title song was written by Peter Hames and "Delerium Tremens" was written by Moore himself—"DTs" was perhaps the most memorable song from the album. It is a satirical song, directed towards the leaders in Irish politics and culture. Some of the people mentioned in the song include:
Charles Haughey, former Fianna Fáil leader
Ruairi Quinn, at the time a Labour TD, later the party leader
Dick Spring, former Labour Party leader
Roger Casement, he was captured bringing German guns to Ireland for the 1916 Rising

"St. Brendan's Voyage", another Christy Moore composition, depicts St. Brendan The Navigator and his journey in an unconventional way.

The original release of the album featured the song "They Never Came Home", which Moore wrote for the victims and families of the Stardust fire which took place on 14 February 1981, in Dublin. The song heavily criticizes the Irish government and the owners of the nightclub. At the time of the album's release an investigation into the fire had  concluded that the cause was most likely arson, a finding which was heavily contested by survivors and families of the victims. However, that meant that in Ireland the song lyrics were found to be libelous and the song was quickly removed from the album.

Track listing
All songs composed by Christy Moore except where indicated. Much of the music for the songs were written by Dónal Lunny. 

Side One

"Sweet Music Roll On" (Graham Lyle, Tom McGuinness)
"Delirium Tremens"
"Ordinary Man" (Peter Hames)
"Matty" (Johnny Mulhearn)
"The Reel in the Flickering Light" (Colm Gallagher)
"The Diamondtina (sic) Drover" (Hugh McDonald)

Side Two
"Blantyre Explosion" (traditional, arr. Moore/Lunny/McGlynn)
"Hard Cases" (Johnny Mulhearn)
"Continental Ceili" (Johnny Mulhearn, Christy Moore)
"St. Brendan's Voyage"
"They Never Came Home" †
"Quiet Desperation" (Floyd Red Crow Westerman)

† later pressings replaced "They Never Came Home" with "Another Song is Born", due to a lawsuit.

Personnel
Christy Moore: lead vocals, guitars
Dónal Lunny: guitars (1,4,6,7,8,9,12), keyboards (1,2,3,4,5,6,7,8,12), mandolins (4,8,12), bouzouki (4,8,10,11,12), vocals(911)
Arty McGlynn: guitars (1,3,4,6,7,8,9,12), pedal steel(3)
Enya Ní Bhraonáin: vocals (1,6,12)
Liam Óg O'Flynn: uilleann pipes (1,7,9,12), tin whistle (12)
Andy Irvine: mandolin (8,10), uncredited harmonica (4)?
Noel 'Nollaig' Bridgeman: accordion (6,8,9)
Noel Eccles: percussion (3), chimes (5)
Tony Molloy: bass (3)
Nicky Ryan: vocals (9)

Production
Recorded at Aigle Studio, Dublin
Produced by Dónal Lunny
Engineers: Philip Begley, Nicky Ryan

Liner notes
"My gratitude to Dónal Lunny for the tender loving care he gave to this album and for his inspiration and encouragement in all things at all times." ~ Christy Moore, June 1985

References

1985 albums
Christy Moore albums